"Ta fête" (French for Your Party) is a song by Belgian singer Stromae. On 3 February 2014 it was released as the fourth single from his second studio album Racine carrée where it appears as the opening track. On 17 March 2014 it was announced that it would become the official song for the Belgian football selection at the 2014 World Cup. An official music video for the song was also released by Stromae official Vevo channel.

Promotion

Music video
The music video was directed by Lieven Van Baelen and released on YouTube on 17 June 2014. Stromae takes on the role of the ring announcer as a man is selected among the spectator crowd to run through and escape a raised obstacle course reminiscent of both The Hunger Games and The Maze Runner. However, it also has deep rooted connections with the 1987 film The Running Man, which shares a similar story of an audience watching a man run through a game and having to fight new armed competitors as they appear eventually gaining freedom, much like the protagonist of the music video.

Chart positions

Weekly charts

Year-end charts

Certifications

Other versions
 Dirty Loops recorded a cover version of this song in 2014

References

External links
  

2014 songs
Stromae songs
Songs written by Stromae
Mercury Records singles
2014 singles